Winston Stephens is a former New Zealand rower.

At the 1962 British Empire and Commonwealth Games he won the gold medal as part of the men's coxed four alongside fellow Waitaki Boys' High School crew members Keith Heselwood, George Paterson, and Hugh Smedley, plus Waikato cox Doug Pulman. Their coach was Rusty Robertson.

References

Year of birth missing (living people)
Living people
New Zealand male rowers
Rowers at the 1962 British Empire and Commonwealth Games
Commonwealth Games gold medallists for New Zealand
Commonwealth Games medallists in rowing
People educated at Waitaki Boys' High School
Medallists at the 1962 British Empire and Commonwealth Games